Žitniće is a village in the municipality of Sjenica, Serbia. According to the 2002 census, the village has a population of 536 people.

References

Populated places in Zlatibor District